Carrowcrom Wedge Tomb is a wedge-shaped gallery grave and National Monument located in County Mayo, Ireland.

Location

History

This wedge tomb was built c. 2500 – 2000 BC, in the Copper or Bronze Age.

Description

Partially renovated. Two roof stones completely cover the gallery. The whole structure is still covered by a U-shaped cairn.

It faces southwest, towards the setting sun.

References

National Monuments in County Mayo
Archaeological sites in County Mayo